Sörnäinen metro station is a station on the Helsinki Metro. It serves the central Helsinki districts of Sörnäinen and Kallio. Sörnäinen is the easternmost station on the system to be located underground.

The station was opened on 1 September 1984 and was designed by Jouko Kontio and Seppo Kilpiä. It is located 900 meters from Hakaniemi metro station, and 1.1 kilometers from Kalasatama metro station. The station is situated at a depth of 25 meters below ground level and 3 meters below sea level.

See also
 Sörnäinen curve

References

External links

Helsinki Metro stations
Railway stations opened in 1984
1984 establishments in Finland
Sörnäinen